Sydney Olympic Football Club is an Australian semi-professional soccer club, based in Belmore, Sydney, New South Wales, that plays in the National Premier Leagues NSW. The Club was founded as Pan-Hellenic Soccer Club in 1957 by Greek immigrants. In 1977, the Club changed its name to Sydney Olympic and became a founding member of the Phillips Soccer League, later named the National Soccer League (NSL), the inaugural national football league of Australia, remaining a member of the competition until its demise in 2004.

Sydney Olympic have won many trophies in Australian football, including two NSL Championships, two NSL Cups, the NSL Minor Premiership and three NSW Premier League Championships. The club has also won the Johnny Warren Cup, the Brett Emerton Cup, the National Youth League Championship, the National Youth League Minor Premiership and the NSW Premier League Club Championship.

Sydney Olympic has traditionally been one of the most well supported football teams in Australia, setting numerous domestic crowd attendances. A crowd of 18,985 attended Sydney Olympic's victory over Northern Spirit in 1998 at North Sydney Oval, a record crowd attendance between two clubs during the regular season of the NSL, defeating the previous record of 18,367 set when Newcastle KB United played Sydney Olympic in 1979 at Marathon Stadium. The greatest crowd attendance for a Grand Final was recorded during the 2001/02 season when 42,735 people were present at Subiaco Oval to see Sydney Olympic defeat Perth Glory.

1957: Pan-Hellenic – The Beginnings
Established in Sydney by Greek immigrants in 1957, Sydney Olympic Football Club has been and continues to be a major pillar and a leading contributor to football in Australia as well as a nursery to many of its finest talents.

In the late 1940s and 50s there were several small Greek teams for the purposes of socialising and giving a sense of home for the newly arrived migrants. These teams included; Taxiarchis, Atlas, Astro, Pansamiakos as well as several others. Many people wondered about uniting all of these smaller teams to establish 1 strong Greek team in order to participate in the NSW Soccer Federation. The founding date of the Club is set as 28 November 1957, as this was the first meeting of Club Founder Christos Giannakoulias with several other influential protagonists at his home. It was decided there, that the newly formed team would be known as Pan-Hellenic, as it represented the shared journeys of Greeks from all over the world who migrated to Sydney and not just from Greece and Cyprus, but also from various other places like; Egypt, Romania, Albania, Yugoslavia, Bulgaria, Anatolia and Asia Minor

The club was established as Pan-Hellenic Soccer Club and its initial strip was blue and white vertical stripes.

1958–60: NSW 2nd Division
In its first season in 1958, Pan-Hellenic found itself in the NSW 2nd Division, which at the time was split into 2 groups – Western & Eastern – After topping its group, Pan-Hellenic faced off with Budapest, who had topped the other group in the Grand Final, which Pan-Hellenic won 3–1. This still was not good enough for promotion and Pan-Hellenic was forced to play a separate play-off with Budapest for promotion. The initial match ended 1–1 and a replay was ordered a few days later, which Budapest won 4–0.

For season 1959, the Federation did away with a Finals Series and promotion playoffs, instead awarding promotion to the club which topped the competition table after the 26 rounds. Pan-Hellenic would miss out again on promotion, as it finished runner-up to Neerlandia.

In 1960 and in what would become a tradition in Australian Football, the format was changed yet again. A Finals Series would be played this season, Pan-Hellenic reached the Grand Final again, but would go on and lose to Polonia 2–1. But this time, the team which would end up atop the competition ladder was crowned the Champions and would be promoted, fortunately for Pan-Hellenic, they finished top of the ladder 1 point ahead of Polonia, were crowned Champions and finally earned promotion to the NSW 1st Division for 1961.

1960s: NSW 1st Division
In its first season in the NSW 1st Division in 1961, the club would finish in the top 4 finishing 4th, a fantastic achievement. In the Finals Series Pan-Hellenic lost its Semi-Final to Hakoah 1–0.

1962 saw Pan-Hellenic finish in 7th place, before rebounding in 1963 to once again make the top 4, finishing 4th once again and qualified for the Finals Series. South Coast United delivered a heavy blow in the Semi-Final, dishing out a 7–1 loss to Pan-Hellenic.

In 1964 Pan-Hellenic finished 6th. While in 1965 the club endured a difficult League campaign, coming within a whisker of being relegated, finishing 2nd last and having to endure the 3 relegation playoff ties. The first 2 ended in draws (0–0 and 1–1) against Polonia, the 3rd match was a 5–4 thriller to Pan-Hellenic. 11,000 turned up on a Wednesday night to see the match, a victory which preserved the club's 1st Division status. This was in total contrast with Pan-Hellenic's Cup form, which saw them go on a run all the way to the Final, only to lose 3–1 to Hakoah.

For season 1966, Pan-Hellenic finished in 5th spot. The club would return to Finals Football once again in 1967 finishing in 4th, but would once again fail to progress in the Finals Series. 1967 also saw Pan-Hellenic go on a great run in the inaugural National Club Knock-Out competition the – Australia Cup – falling one game short of the Final, as it lost to APIA Leichhardt 3–2 after extra-time in the Semi-Final.

The 1968 season though, was the highlight of the pre-National Soccer League era, 11 years after the club's foundation, Pan-Hellenic finished 2nd in the standings and reached the NSW First Division Grand Final for the first time. Pan-Hellenic would unfortunately lose 4–2 to bitter rivals Hakoah in front of a crowd of 22,111 at the Sydney Sports Ground. In 1969 Pan-Hellenic would have to settle for a mid-table 6th-placed finish. The club also experienced another great Cup run making it to the Final once again in 1969, a Final it would ultimately lose 3–2 to Prague.

1970s

After some lean seasons: 
1970 (8th), 1971 (10th), 1972 (7th), 1973 (9th)

1974 saw a marked improvement in the team under Socceroos coach Rale Rasic. Pan-Hellenic just missed out on the top 4 to finish in 5th spot. 1975 did see Pan-Hellenic once again make the top 4, finishing in 3rd place. In the Finals Series Pan-Hellenic dispatched Auburn 2–1 in the Semi-Final to make it through to the Preliminary Final, which the club went on to lose 1–0 after extra-time to APIA Leichhardt, in a tight and tense affair.

In its final season in the NSW State League for the time being and its last season under the name Pan-Hellenic in 1976, the club just missed out on a Finals spot, ending up in 5th place.

1977: Sydney Olympic & the NSL
For 1977 the club became a pioneering founding member of the National Soccer League, and also changed its name to Sydney Olympic.

Sydney Olympic had a tough initiation into National League Football in 1977, finishing 3rd last. 1978 saw a vast improvement from Sydney Olympic as it finished in a much-improved and respectable mid-table position.

In 1979 Sydney Olympic endured another difficult campaign, finishing in 2nd last place. The Federation at the time, then made the decision to "cut back" on teams from NSW and being the last placed NSW team, beating only South Melbourne who had finished last, Sydney Olympic was controversially relegated.

1980s
The spell back in the NSW First Division competition for the club did not last long, with Sydney Olympic defeating the Parramatta Eagles 4–0 in the 1980 NSW Grand Final to win the NSW First Division. That victory secured Sydney Olympic a return to top-flight Australian football in 1981 where it remained until the NSL folded in 2004.

The 1980s for Sydney Olympic were characterized with great football, large and passionate support, fantastic players, unfathomable highs as well as a litany of failures.

Seasons 1981 and 1982 were a period of stabilisation for the club, as it settled back into the National Soccer League. Sydney Olympic finished both seasons in the safety of mid-table security. During this period many young players and future legends of the club would be given their opportunity to make their mark for Sydney Olympic.

The mid-1980s are generally referred to as a Golden Era for Sydney Olympic. It was exciting times and the club was on a high, huge crowds flocked and followed the club wherever they were playing, and on the park the team was playing magnificent football and in later years would be labelled as one of the best club sides in Australian football history.

Between 1983 and 1986 Sydney Olympic played in 4 consecutive National Finals. Beating Heidelberg United in the 1983 NSL Cup Final and beating Preston Lions in the 1985 NSL Cup Final. Sydney Olympic also made it to the NSL Grand Finals of 1984 and 1986, losing to South Melbourne FC and Adelaide City respectively.

After this period, there was an exodus of players at Sydney Olympic meaning the team almost had to be re-built, as only a few players would remain. It showed as the club dropped back to a mid-table finish for season 1987.

Sydney Olympic bounced back in season 1988 to finish 5th and qualify for the Finals Series once again. Though disappointingly, they would go on to lose that Semi-Final 3–1 to the Marconi Stallions.

1989 would prove to be a bitter-sweet end to the decade for Sydney Olympic. The club climbed the ladder and enjoyed a great season, finishing 3rd and once again qualifying for the Finals. A Semi-Final victory over Melbourne Knights was followed by a Preliminary Final victory over St George FC, meaning Sydney Olympic found themselves in their 3rd NSL Grand Final in 6 years. But it would not be 3rd time lucky for the Blues, as they succumbed to an injury-time winner in the Grand Final to lose 1–0 to Marconi in front of 23,387 fans at the Parramatta Stadium. 1989 also saw another great NSL Cup run for Sydney Olympic, reaching another Final. But the club could not make up for their Grand Final loss & lost the 1989 NSL Cup Final 2–0 to Adelaide City.

1990s

The 1990s began on the right foot for the club as it sneaked into that year's NSL Finals Series in 5th. After a historic Finals run, winning 3-straight sudden death away Finals against Adelaide City, South Melbourne and Melbourne Knights and a year after Sydney Olympic's 1989 NSL Grand Final loss against Marconi, 1990 saw Sydney Olympic meet Marconi once again in the Grand Final. This time it would be Olympic's day as they exacted revenge by beating Marconi 2–0, before a then record NSL crowd of 26,353. Scorers that day were Alistair Edwards and Robert Ironside either side of half-time. 1990 also saw Sydney Olympic reach another NSL Cup Final, their 4th in 8 years, unfortunately going down to South Melbourne.

In defense of their title in season 1990/91, Sydney Olympic endured an inconsistent season, which came down to the last match of the regular season in what became a pre-Finals Series playoff against 6th placed Parramatta Melita. Sitting in 5th, a draw would have been enough for Olympic to finish in the top 5 and qualify for the Finals, but a late Parramatta goal ensured Olympic would succumb to a 1–0 loss and were leapfrogged into the top 5 by Parramatta FC.

Sydney Olympic surged once again in season 1991/92, missing out on the Minor Premiership by 1 point. Things were looking promising heading into that season's Finals Series, but it was not to be as Olympic were disappointingly bundled out of the Finals.

The next few seasons were inconsistent for Olympic. 1992/93 (9th), 1993/94 (6th), 1994/95 (9th).

For season 1995/96, Sydney Olympic formed a prosperous partnership with the University of Technology Sydney (UTS) and became known as UTS Sydney Olympic. During that time, the Club's home ground was Leichhardt Oval, 1995/96 also saw Olympic finish 3rd on the ladder 1 point behind eventual Minor Premiers and old foes Marconi. Qualifying for the Finals Series again, Olympic were eventually eliminated by Adelaide City.

A change of home ground awaited the Blues going into season 1996/97. Belmore Sports Ground, in the more traditional heartland of Olympic, became the Club's new home. In April 1997, Sydney Olympic enjoyed a record home attendance in the NSL at Belmore, of 16,724 against Marconi. Sydney Olympic missed out on Finals Football ending the season in 9th.
 
Season 1997/98 also saw the club's worst ever defeat in January 1998, when the Canberra Cosmos inflicted an 8–1 loss on Sydney Olympic in the nation's capital. This season saw Olympic finish 9th.

During season 1998/99 Sydney Olympic was involved in a match which attracted the largest crowd for any regular NSL season match excluding finals. That game was against the Northern Spirit at North Sydney Oval in what was the Spirit's debut match in the NSL. That evening, 18,985 soccer-loving enthusiasts turned out to watch Sydney Olympic defeat new boys Northern Spirit 2–0. Olympic golden boys Chris Kalantzis and Pablo Cardozo were the goal scorers. The season saw Olympic finish 7th, missing the Finals

2000–2004

The 2000s saw Olympic's fortunes take an upturn. 1999/2000 saw their biggest ever NSL win, a 6–0 defeat of South Melbourne in January 2000 at Belmore Sports Ground. The club would again make the Finals that season, finishing in 5th place. During the Finals Series Sydney Olympic beat Adelaide City over 2 legs, but would go on to lose to Carlton SC in extra-time, for a spot in the Preliminary Final.

In season 2000/01, Sydney Olympic finished 4th on the competition ladder. In the Finals Series, Olympic eliminated Marconi and then Melbourne Knights to make it through to the Preliminary Final, a match they lost 2–0 to the Minor Premiers South Melbourne.

Season 2001/02 saw the club move base again, this time to the Sutherland Shire in Sydney's south, an area with no NSL representation, but a large base of registered junior players to potentially tap into. Olympic played out of Toyota Park. The move had also involved a change of name from Sydney Olympic to Olympic Sharks with the traditional blue and white colours of the club still in place. This season also saw Olympic capture their 2nd NSL Championship, a lone Ante Milicic goal early in the second-half, being enough to defeat Perth Glory at Subiaco Oval in front of 42,735 fans.

The 2002/03 season saw Sydney Olympic win its first ever Minor Premiership by finishing on top of the NSL ladder, which eventually led to Olympic's second consecutive appearance in the NSL Grand Final. This time however, it would be the Perth Glory who would take out the title, winning 2–0 in Perth, in front of 38,111 fans.

Despite the on field successes, the move to the Sutherland Shire was short-lived. Poor attendances took their toll on the venture and for season 2003/04 the club chose to revert to the widely preferred name of Sydney Olympic and moving to OKI Jubilee Stadium at Kogarah.

2004–2009: Back to the State Leagues
Following the demise of the NSL in 2004, Sydney Olympic participated in the 2004/05 NSW Premier League season and just missed out on the Finals Series. In 2006 Sydney Olympic returned to Belmore Sports Ground where the club had a mid-table finish of 6th.

2007 was a special year for Sydney Olympic as it celebrated the 50th anniversary of its founding, with the club's jersey reverting to the original blue and white vertical striped design. On the field it would turn out to be a forgettable year for the club, as it ended the season in 9th spot.

In the 2008 season under the stewardship of former player Milan Blagojevic, the club laid the platform for what would be a successful season by capturing the 2008 pre-season Johnny Warren Cup with a gutsy 2–1 win over the Sutherland Sharks. During the regular season, Sydney Olympic finished 3rd on the ladder, their best league finish since the 2002/03 NSL season. In the ensuing Finals Series Olympic were stopped 1 game short of that season's Grand Final losing in the Preliminary Final to Sutherland. The 2008 season also saw Olympic make the Waratah Cup Final, only to lose that Final.

In season 2009, Sydney Olympic dropped back down the ladder, ending the season in a disappointing 8th spot.

2010s
The new decade would start off in a miserable way. Season 2010 saw Sydney Olympic equal their worst ever league finish, ending the season in 2nd last spot.

In 2011, Sydney Olympic with a new coaching staff and many new players finished in 1st place, four points clear of Sydney rivals Sydney United FC to claim the Minor Premiership. In the Finals Series Olympic beat Sydney United 2–0 in the Semi-Final and beat them again by the same score-line in the Grand Final, in front of 10,000+ fans at Belmore Sports Ground and went on to become NSW Champions again.

2012 saw Sydney Olympic finish 2nd in the NSW Premier League, but were bundled out of the Finals Series in straight sets and in 2013 Sydney Olympic finished a disappointing 7th.

In 2014, former Greek international centre-back Sotirios Kyrgiakos signed for the club. Kyrgiakos stated in the press conference; "It's a beautiful thing for me to come to Sydney & play football in Australia. I wanted to have this experience and this opportunity was available for a handful of games, which was the proposal from the club. I will be thrilled to get to know Australian football and experience it and it's very significant that I'm coming to a very historic club with great Greek support". Sydney Olympic finished the regular season in 4th, before embarking on an amazing Finals run. Winning 3 sudden death matches in succession to make it to the NSW Grand Final, only to lose 2–1 to Blacktown City after extra-time. In 2014 Sydney Olympic also made it to the FFA Cup Round of 16 only to be defeated 2–1 by Bentleigh Greens after a compressed end of year schedule eventually took its toll on the team.

In 2015 Sydney Olympic finished 4th in the regular season again after a great end to the regular season, which saw the team win 5 straight matches. After a convincing 2–0 victory in the first week of the Finals against Wollongong Wolves, the team set up a Semi-Final showdown against old rivals APIA Leichhardt, who took a 1–0 lead via a deflection. Sydney Olympic couldn't capitalise on a string of great chances in the second half to equalise, seeing the team eliminated 1–0. In 2015 Sydney Olympic again made it to the Round of 16 stage of the FFA Cup, but were disappointingly eliminated following a 3–1 loss to Hume City FC.

For 2016, Sydney Olympic endured an up and down season where it finished the season in 6th spot. In 2017, Sydney Olympic reached the Finals again, but were knocked out by Manly United in the first week. The club was also knocked out of the Cup in the early rounds in both 2016 and 2017.

In 2018, Sydney Olympic returned to winning ways. First clinching the Minor Premiership in a nail-biting last day of the season by leap-frogging old rivals APIA Leichhardt to finish top. This was added to by winning the Grand Final 3–1 and being crowned Champions, also against APIA Leichhardt.

In 2019, Sydney Olympic experienced an up and down season trying to defend their title from the previous season. Finishing the season 6th, they missed the Finals. They were also knocked out of the Cup in the early rounds.

2020s

Due to the outbreak of the COVID-19 pandemic, the 2020 season was suspended in April after 3 Rounds. The competition only resumed after a 4 month hiatus and returned in August, as a shortened 11-round season, with the club finishing in 4th position. Both the State and National Cup competitions were cancelled.

2021 would also be a season affected by the ongoing COVID-19 pandemic. The State Cup was cancelled, as was the League season, which was officially announced by Football NSW on August 12, 2021, with Sydney Olympic sitting in 4th spot at the time. Meanwhile the 2021 FFA Cup season was re-scheduled and took place, with Sydney Olympic making it to the Round of 32 stage, before being knocked out 4-2 by Sydney FC

2022 saw Sydney Olympic win the NSW NPL Minor Premiership, clinching it on the final day with victory over Blacktown City to leapfrog them to top spot. In the Finals Series, the club was disappointingly bundled out 1 game short of the Grand Final. Meanwhile in the Cup, the club was eliminated in the early rounds.

Players

Current squad

Player Records

Appearances

1. – 412 – Gary Meier 
2. – 312 – Gary Phillips
3. – 281 – David Barrett
4. – 259 – Peter Raskopoulos
5. – 251 – Tony Spyridakos
6. – 246 – Paul Henderson
7. – 243 – William Angel*
8. – 230 – Comino Omeros
9. – 212 – Brian Smith
10. – 210 – Elias Augerinos
10. – 210 – Ante Juric
12. – 204 – Graham Jennings

Goals

1. – 72 – Brian Smith
2. – 69 – Dave Harding
3. – 68 – Pablo Cardozo
4. – 60 – Marshall Soper
4. – 60 – Norman Tome
6. – 53 – Mark Koussas
6. – 53 – Abbas Saad
8. – 50 – Doug Logan
9. – 48 – John Karagiannis
10. – 46 – Sotiris Patrinos
11. – 45 – Kostas Karanikolas
12. – 44 – Robert Ironside

Notable Internationals

 Australia
Terry Antonis
Walter Ardone
Andy Bernal
Milan Blagojevic
Roy Blitz
Clint Bolton
Tim Cahill
Nick Carle
Pablo Cardozo
Jason Culina
John Doyle
Alistair Edwards
Brett Emerton
Rodolfo Gnavi

Troy Halpin
Dave Harding
Robert Hooker
Graham Jennings
Ante Juric
Chris Kalantzis
John Karaspyros
Peter Katholos
John Kosmina
Mark Koussas
Massimo Luongo
Garry Manuel
Ante Milicic
Dave Mitchell
Danny Moulis

Jade North
Scott Ollerenshaw
Jim Patikas
Dimitri Petratos
Jason Polak
Tom Pondeljak
Peter Raskopoulos
Abbas Saad
Marshall Soper
Tony Spyridakos
Kimon Taliadoros
Kris Trajanovski
Alan Westwater
Lindsay Wilson
Ned Zelic

 Greece
Sotirios Kyrgiakos
Takis Loukanidis
Kostas Davourlis
Vassilis Stravopodis
 New Zealand
Andrew Durante
Clint Gosling
Kevin Hagan
Ricki Herbert
Robert Ironside
Michael McGarry
Glen Moss
Chris Zoricich

 Lebanon
Yahya El Hindi
 Liberia
Mass Sarr Jr.
 Philippines
Iain Ramsay  
 Scotland
David Provan
 Uruguay
Vicente Estavillo
 Wales
Ian Rush
 Netherlands
Wim van der Gaag

Club officials
Directors
 President: Damon Hanlin
 Directors: Damon Hanlin, Chris Gardiner, Lawrie McKinna

Management
 CEO: Lawrie McKinna
 Head coach: Labinot Haliti
 Assistant coach: Roy O'Donovan
 Under 20s Coach: Jim Patikas
 Women's First Grade Coach: Alberto Di Sciascio
 Women's Reserve Grade Coach: Arthur Beltsos

Former coaches

  John Phillips
  Julius Polgar
  Walter Tamandl
  Frank Hearn
  Bill Vrolyks
  Joe Vlasits
  George Yangou
  Takis Loukanidis
  John Kalogeras
  Rale Rasic
  Raul Blanco
  Bruce Stowell
  Tommy Anderson
  Joe Marston
  Jimmy Adam
  Tommy Docherty
  Doug Collins
  Manfred Schaefer
  Eddie Thomson
  Mick Hickman
  Peter Raskopoulos
  Bertie Mariani
  Vicente Estavillo
  Tom Sermanni
  David Ratcliffe
  Geoff Harcombe
  Dave Mitchell
  Branko Culina
  Gary Phillips
  Lee Sterrey
  Peter Papanikitas
  Les Scheinflug
  Chris Kalantzis
  Milan Blagojevic
  Aytek Genc
  Nick Theodorakopoulos
  Manny Spanoudakis
  André Gumprecht
  Steve O'Connor
  Peter Tsekenis
  Grant Lee
  Jaime Monroy
  Gorka Etxeberria
  Abbas Saad
  Terry Palapanis
  Ante Juric

Honours

National Soccer League
Winners (2): 1990, 2002
Runners Up (4): 1984, 1986, 1989, 2003

National Soccer League Minor Premiership
Winners (1): 2003
Runners Up (3): 1984, 1986, 1992

Australia Cup/NSL Cup/FFA/Australia Cup
Winners (2): 1983, 1985
Runners Up (2): 1989, 1990
Semi-Finalists (2): 1967, 1995
Quarter-Finalists (5): 1968, 1986, 1988, 1996, 1997

National Youth League
Winners (1): 1987
Runners Up (1): 1991

NSW Premier League/NSW 1st Division
Winners (3): 1980, 2011, 2018
Runners Up (2): 1968, 2014

NSW Premier League/NSW 1st Division Minor Premiership
Winners (3): 2011, 2018, 2022
Runners Up (3): 1968, 1980, 2012

NSW Super League/NSW 2nd Division
Winners (2): 1958, 1960
Runners Up (1): 1959

NSW State/Federation/AMPOL/Waratah Cup
Winners (1): 1980
Runners Up (4): 1965. 1969, 1994, 2008

Johnny Warren Cup
Winners (1): 2008

Individual honours

NSL Player of the Year Award
1982 – Peter Katholos

NSL Top Goalscorer Award
1991/1992 – Tim Bredbury
1998/1999 – Pablo Cardozo

NSL Under 21 Player of the Year Award
1997/1998 – Brett Emerton

NSW NPL Goalkeeper of the Year Award
2017 – Paul Henderson
2018 – Paul Henderson

NSW NPL Top Goalscorer Award
2022 – Roy O'Donovan

Hall of Fame
On 6 March 2018, Sydney Olympic announced their thirteenth Hall of Fame inductee.

Mark Bosnich
Nick Carle
Pablo Cardozo
Graham Jennings
Ante Juric
Chris Kalantzis
Peter Katholos
Grant Lee
Gary Meier
Les Murray
Jim Patikas
Abbas Saad
Peter Raskopoulos

References

External links
 Sydney Olympic FC official website
 SoccerAust
 OZ Football

 
National Premier Leagues clubs
Greek-Australian culture in Sydney
National Soccer League (Australia) teams
New South Wales Premier League teams
Association football clubs established in 1957
Diaspora sports clubs in Australia